Penny Squibb (born 9 February 1993) is an Australian field hockey player.

Career

National Representation
Squibb plays representative hockey for her home state, Western Australia, in national competition. She represents the WA Diamonds in the Australian Hockey League. At the 2017 tournament, Squibb was equal highest scorer, with 7 goals.

International Representation

Jillaroos
Penny Squibb made her debut for the Australia U–21 team during a Four Nations Tournament in New Delhi.

Hockeyroos
In 2017, Squibb was named in the Australian national development squad for the first time.

Squibb is set to make her international debut for Australia in November 2018, at the Hockey Champions Trophy. Squibb is one of four players included in the team who are not part of Hockey Australia's centralised training program.

Squibb qualified for the Tokyo 2020 Olympics. She was part of the Hockeyroos Olympics squad. The Hockeyroos lost 1-0 to India in the quarterfinals and therefore were not in medal contention.

References

External links
 
 
 

1993 births
Living people
Australian female field hockey players
Field hockey players at the 2022 Commonwealth Games
Female field hockey midfielders
20th-century Australian women
21st-century Australian women
Commonwealth Games silver medallists for Australia
Commonwealth Games medallists in field hockey
People from the Great Southern (Western Australia)
Sportswomen from Western Australia
Medallists at the 2022 Commonwealth Games